Washington Run is a  long 2nd order tributary to the Youghiogheny River in Fayette County, Pennsylvania.

Course
Washington Run rises about 1 miles west of Curfew, Pennsylvania, and then flows north and turns east to join the Youghiogheny River across from Layton.

Watershed
Washington Run drains  of area, receives about 41.9 in/year of precipitation, has a wetness index of 353.54, and is about 51% forested.

References

 
Tributaries of the Ohio River
Rivers of Pennsylvania
Rivers of Fayette County, Pennsylvania
Allegheny Plateau